Juban may refer to:

 Juban (Upper Yafa), a sheikhdom and dependency of Upper Yafa
 Juban, Albania, a settlement in Shkodër County
 Juban, Iran, a village in Gilan Province, Iran
 Juban, Sorsogon, a municipality in the Philippines
 Juban District, Dhale Governorate, Yemen
 Jewban or Juban, a Jewish Cuban
 Azabu-Jūban, in Minato, Tokyo, Japan
 An undergarment worn underneath a kimono

See also
 Juba (disambiguation), of whose various meanings "Juban" may be the adjective form
 Juband, a village in East Azerbaijan Province, Iran